Diascia rigescens, called the stiff twinspur, is a species of flowering plant in the genus Diascia, native to South Africa. It has gained the Royal Horticultural Society's Award of Garden Merit.

References

Scrophulariaceae
Endemic flora of South Africa
Plants described in 1836